Clark—also known as Keller Ferry—is an unincorporated community located along the Columbia River in the U.S. state of Washington.
Most buildings in the community are grouped around the Keller Ferry Campground at the south side of the Keller Ferry crossing. There are several businesses, including a car repair shop and a convenience store. The community is located on Lake Roosevelt, just south of the Lake Roosevelt National Recreation Area. The town is named after Todd Clark. At one time, the town also had a post office.

References

Unincorporated communities in Washington (state)
Unincorporated communities in Lincoln County, Washington
Washington (state) populated places on the Columbia River